The Southern Mande languages (called 'Southeastern Mande' in Kastenholz, who calls the superior Southeastern Mande node 'Eastern') are a branch of the Mande languages spoken across Ivory Coast and into Liberia.

Member languages
Beng
Dan
Gban
Gbin
Goo
Guro
Mano
Mwa
Tura
Wan
Yaure

Classification
The following internal classification is from Dwyer (1989, 1996), as summarized in Williamson & Blench 2000.

Vydrin (2009) places Mwan with Guro-Yaure.

There is also an extinct Gbin language. Paperno classifies Gbin and Beng as two primary branches of Southern Mande.

See also
Proto-South Mande reconstructions (Wiktionary)

References

Mande languages